State Road 482 (SR 482), named Sand Lake Road and McCoy Road, is an east–west state highway in south Orlando, Florida, United States. It is a surface road providing access to some of Orlando's biggest tourist attractions.

Route description
Sand Lake Road begins at Apopka-Vineland Road in Dr. Phillips. State maintenance as SR 482 begins between Turkey Lake Road and Interstate 4 (SR 400). SR 482 heads east past the International Drive area to a partial cloverleaf interchange with State Road 435 (Kirkman Road) just north of the entrance to Lockheed Martin.  East of that, SR 482 continues towards an intersection with County Road 423 (John Young Parkway), crossing over Florida's Turnpike, and intersects US 17/US 92/US 441 (Orange Blossom Trail) just west of The Florida Mall.  It continues east, changing names from Sand Lake Road to McCoy Road at State Road 527 (Orange Avenue). SR 482 ends at the interchange with State Road 528 (Beachline Expressway) and Boggy Creek Road west of Orlando International Airport; McCoy Road continues as the north-side frontage road to SR 528, cut in several places, to State Road 15 (Narcoossee Road).

Attractions
On this road features the World's Largest Entertainment McDonald's. The planned Skyplex complex would also be located at the corner of SR 482 and International Drive.

History
It was part of State Road 528 and then State Road 528A before being renumbered SR 482.

Major intersections

References

External links

482
482
482